Pfungstadt station is a railway station in the municipality of Pfungstadt, located in the Darmstadt-Dieburg district in Hesse, Germany.

History
The station was opened with the Pfungstadt Railway by the Grand Duchy of Hesse State Railways in 1886. This was taken by Grand Duke Louis IV of Hesse-Darmstadt as an opportunity to give Pfungstadt town privileges. The original station building has been demolished. A new, simply-equipped station with a 140 metre-long platform was built on the foundations of the historic station for the reactivation. Access for local traffic is provided by a terminal loop and a park and ride parking area. Of the total costs of €2.8 million, the state of Hesse assumed €170,000 and the rest was shared by the town and the federal government.

References

Railway stations in Hesse
Buildings and structures in Darmstadt-Dieburg
Railway stations in Germany opened in 1886